The Adjustment Bureau is a 2011 American science fiction romantic thriller film written and directed by George Nolfi, based on the 1954 Philip K. Dick short story "Adjustment Team". Starring Matt Damon, Emily Blunt, Anthony Mackie, John Slattery, and Terence Stamp, the film tells the story of a United States congressman who discovers that what appear to be chance events in his life are controlled by a mysterious, powerful group. After an event not planned by these controllers occurs—a romantic encounter with a dancer—he struggles against their manipulation, despite their promise of a great future for him.

The film premiered at the Ziegfeld Theatre on February 14, 2011, and was released in theaters in the United States on March 4. It received mostly positive reviews from critics and grossed $127 million, against a production budget of $50 million.

Plot

In 2006, Brooklyn Congressman David Norris unsuccessfully runs for the United States Senate. While rehearsing his concession speech, he meets Elise Sellas, and they share a passionate kiss. David does not get Elise's name before they are separated, but, inspired by her, he delivers an unusually candid speech that is well-received and makes him a favorite for the next Senate election.

A month later, Harry Mitchell receives an assignment from Richardson at Madison Square Park, which is near David's home. He is supposed to spill coffee on David's shirt by 7:05 a.m., forcing David to go home to change, but he falls asleep, so David catches his intended bus to his new job and meets Elise again. Before she gets off the bus, David gets her name and phone number.

David arrives at work before he was supposed to and finds his coworkers frozen and being examined by unfamiliar men, Richardson among them. He attempts to escape, but is incapacitated and taken to a warehouse. After some debate about what to do, Richardson reveals to David the existence of the "Adjustment Bureau", an organization that ensures people's lives proceed according to "the Plan" created by "the Chairman". He says David was not supposed to see Elise a second time, so he destroys the card with her phone number on it, and then he releases David, warning him that his memory and personality will be erased if he tells anyone about what he has learned.

Three years later, David spots Elise on the street. He gets off the bus and invites her to lunch, but Charlie (David’s campaign manager), after an adjustment initiated by Richardson, interrupts them with reminders that David is scheduled to announce he is running for another Senate seat. Richardson tries to prevent David and Elise from reuniting after the announcement, but David stubbornly persists and outruns Richardson to Elise's rehearsal with Cedar Lake Contemporary Ballet, even though members of the Bureau have a way to teleport using ordinary doorways.

Richardson learns that David and Elise keep crossing paths because of remnants from earlier versions of the Plan in which they were meant to be together, and Thompson, a senior official in the Bureau, takes over David's case. He brings David back to the warehouse, where David argues he has the right to choose his own path through life, but Thompson says humans only have the appearance of free will, as the Bureau's experiments with withdrawing their influence resulted in the Dark Ages and the horrors of the first half of the twentieth century, respectively. Thompson tells David that being with Elise will keep him from his fate of becoming President of the United States, and being with David will keep Elise from becoming a world-famous dancer and choreographer. To prove he is serious, Thompson causes Elise to sprain her ankle, and David abandons her at the hospital to avoid ruining their futures.

Eleven months later, Charlie, David's campaign manager and lifelong best friend, alerts David to Elise's imminent wedding. Harry surreptitiously arranges to meet with David when it is raining, since water prevents the Bureau from tracking people. As David's "caseworker", Harry feels guilty about all of the negative things he has helped to make happen to David in support of the Plan, so he teaches David how to use doors to teleport and, hopefully, reach Elise before the Bureau can stop him. David finds Elise just before the wedding and tells her about the Bureau, proving what he says by teleporting with her. Agents of the Bureau pursue them all over New York City, and, eventually, David decides to try to plead his case directly to the Chairman. Elise chooses to accompany him, and they enter the Bureau's headquarters. Chased to the roof and surrounded, David and Elise declare their love and kiss. When they let go of each other, they are alone. Thompson appears, but he is interrupted by Harry, who presents the Chairman's newly-revised Plan for David and Elise, which is blank going forward. Harry commends David and Elise for their devotion and sends them away, speculating that the Chairman's true "plan" may be for people to fight for their free will and write their own destinies, like David and Elise did.

Cast

 Matt Damon as David Norris
 Emily Blunt as Elise Sellas
 Anthony Mackie as Harry Mitchell
 John Slattery as Richardson
 Michael Kelly as Charlie Traynor
 Terence Stamp as Thompson
 Donnie Keshawarz as Donaldson
 Anthony Ruivivar as McCrady
 David Bishins as Burdensky
 Amanda Warren as Senior Campaign Aide
 Jennifer Ehle as Brooklyn Ice House Bartender
 Pedro Pascal as Maitre D' Paul De Santo
 Brian Haley as Police Officer Maes
 Jessica Lee Keller as Lauren, Elise's Best Friend
 Shane McRae as Adrian Troussant, Elise's Fiancé
 David Alan Basche as Thompson’s Aide

Chuck Scarborough, Jon Stewart, Michael Bloomberg, James Carville, Mary Matalin, and Betty Liu appear as themselves.

Production

Writing
In early drafts of the script, the character of Norris was changed from a real-estate salesman, as in Philip K. Dick's short story, to an up-and-coming U.S. Congressman.

Financing
Media Rights Capital funded the film and then auctioned it to distributors, with Universal Studios putting in the winning bid of $62 million. Variety reported Damon's involvement on February 24, 2009, and Blunt's on July 14.

Filming
Writer/director George Nolfi worked with John Toll as his cinematographer. Shots were planned in advance with storyboards, but changed often during shooting to fit the conditions of the day. The visual plan for the film was to use a dolly or crane to keep camera movements smooth and employ a more formal style when the Adjustment Bureau is in full control, and to use hand-held cameras and allow things to become more loose when the Bureau is losing control.

Original ending
The climactic scene on the "Top of the Rock" rooftop observation deck of 30 Rockefeller Plaza was filmed four months after the completion of principal photography. According to Nolfi, the ending that had originally been shot featured "the Chairman":

The Chairman was later revealed to have been portrayed by actress Shohreh Aghdashloo, who, in her 2013 memoir The Alley of Love and Yellow Jasmines, said Nolfi told her that Universal Pictures was to blame for the change to the ending. She said in an interview with the Los Angeles Times:

Music
The score for the film was composed by Thomas Newman, and two songs by Richard Ashcroft appear on the soundtrack: "Future's Bright" (which was co-written by Newman) during the opening sequence and "Are You Ready?" during the end credits.

Religious themes
Some reviewers identified Abrahamic theological implications in the film, such as an omnipotent and omniscient God, the concepts of free will and predestination, and elements from the descent to the underworld (a mytheme dating back at least to the story of Eurydice and Orpheus). Cathleen Falsani said that the Chairman represents God, while his caseworkers are angels. The director of the film, George Nolfi, stated that the "intention of this film is to raise questions."

Release
The Adjustment Bureau had its world premiere on February 14, 2011, at the Ziegfeld Theatre on 141 West 54th Street in New York City. Writer/director George Nolfi was in attendance along with members of the cast, including Matt Damon and Emily Blunt. The film was released in theaters in the U.S. on March 4.

Box office
In its opening weekend in the United States (March 4–6, 2011), the film grossed $21,157,730, which was the second most of any film that weekend, behind Rango. Its total worldwide gross was $127,869,379, .

Critical response
At Metacritic, the film has a score of 60 out of 100 based on 41 reviews, indicating "mixed or average reviews".

Roger Ebert of the Chicago Sun-Times gave the film three out of four stars, describing it as "a smart and good movie that could have been a great one, if it had been a little more daring. I suspect the filmmakers were reluctant to follow its implications too far." The New York Times called the film "a fast, sure film about finding and keeping love across time and space ... [that] has brightened the season with a witty mix of science-fiction metaphysics and old-fashioned romance."

Home media
The film was released on DVD and Blu-ray Disc on June 21, 2011. It was the top selling release the first week it was for sale.

See also
 List of films about angels

References

External links

 
 
 
 
 
 
 

2010s romantic thriller films
2010s science fiction films
2011 directorial debut films
2011 films
American romantic thriller films
American science fiction thriller films
Fictional secret societies
Films about elections
Films about politicians
Films about secret societies
Films based on short fiction
Films based on works by Philip K. Dick
Films directed by George Nolfi
Films scored by Thomas Newman
Films set in 2006
Films set in 2009
Films set in 2010
Films set in New York City
Films shot in New York City
Films with screenplays by George Nolfi
Magic realism films
Media Rights Capital films
Metaphysical fiction films
Universal Pictures films
2010s English-language films
2010s American films